Henricus Petrus Johannes "Henk" van Gerven (born 11 March 1955 in Riethoven) is a Dutch politician and general practitioner. As a member of the Socialist Party (Socialistische Partij) he was an MP from 30 November 2006 to 23 March 2017. He focused on matters of health care (especially physicians, hospitals and medications), natural environment and public expenditure.

From 1995 to 1996 he was a member of the States-Provincial of North Brabant. From 1996 to 2006 he was a member of the municipal council of Oss and also an alderman of this North Brabant municipality from both 1996 to 2000 and from 2002 to 2006.

Van Gerven studied medicine at Radboud University Nijmegen.

References

External links 

  House of Representatives biography

1955 births
Living people
20th-century Dutch politicians
21st-century Dutch politicians
Aldermen in North Brabant
Dutch general practitioners
Members of the House of Representatives (Netherlands)
Members of the Provincial Council of North Brabant
Municipal councillors of Oss
People from Bergeijk
Radboud University Nijmegen alumni
Socialist Party (Netherlands) politicians